Neal McCoy is the fifth studio album by the American country music artist of the same name, released in 1996. His fifth studio album overall, it features the singles "Then You Can Tell Me Goodbye" (a cover of The Casinos' hit single from 1967), "Going, Going, Gone" (previously recorded by Bryan White on his self-titled debut album), and "That Woman of Mine". The song "Hillbilly Rap" is a country rap song which samples "The Banana Boat Song", "The Ballad of Jed Clampett", and "Rapper's Delight".

Track listing
"That Woman of Mine" (Don Cook, Tim Mensy) – 2:53
"Then You Can Tell Me Goodbye" (John D. Loudermilk) – 3:17
"Me Too" (Wendell Mobley, Jim Robinson) – 3:16
"It Should've Happened That Way" (Steve Dorff, Michael Lunn, Jeff Pennig) – 3:18
"I Ain't Complainin'" (Jess Brown, Aggie Brown) – 3:09
"Going, Going, Gone" (Steve Cropper, Bob DiPiero, John Scott Sherrill) – 3:50
"Betcha Can't Do That Again" (Gene Dobbins, John Ramey, Bobby Taylor) – 3:38
"She Can" (Austin Gardner, Steve Seskin) – 3:44
"If It Hadn't Been So Good" (Walt Aldridge, John Jarrard) – 2:58
"Hillbilly Rap" – 4:04
"The Banana Boat Song" written by Irving Burgie and William Attaway
"The Ballad of Jed Clampett" written by Paul Henning
"Rapper's Delight" written by Bernard Edwards and Nile Rodgers
arranged by Neal McCoy

Personnel
Eddie Bayers – drums
Barry Beckett – keyboards
Paul Franklin – steel guitar
Neal McCoy - lead vocals
Terry McMillan – percussion, harmonica
Phil Naish – keyboards
Bobby Ogdin – keyboards
Donny Parenteau – fiddle, mandolin
Don Potter – acoustic guitar
Michael Rhodes – bass guitar
Brent Rowan – electric guitar
John Wesley Ryles – background vocals
Dennis Wilson – background vocals
Curtis "Mr. Harmony" Young – background vocals

Charts

Weekly charts

Year-end charts

References

1996 albums
Albums produced by Barry Beckett
Atlantic Records albums
Neal McCoy albums